Scott James McLeod (born 28 February 1973) is a New Zealand rugby union coach and former second-five eighth and centre. McLeod played 10 tests for the All Blacks from 1996 to 1998, and played domestic rugby for Waikato, Waikato Chiefs, and Toshiba Brave Lupus. McLeod is currently the assistant coach of the All Blacks. He replaced Wayne Smith as defence coach for the All Blacks after their third Bledisloe test against Australia on 22nd of October 2017.

Provincial career and Super 12
McLeod was born in Brisbane, Australia. He first came to prominence playing amateur club rugby in Hamilton and in John Boe's Waikato Colts teams. He made his NPC debut for Waikato in 1995 and was named as a standby for the All Blacks 1995 end of year tour of Italy and France.  In 1996, McLeod made his Super 12 debut for the Waikato Chiefs. He went on to play 69 matches for Waikato and 44 matches for the Chiefs; towards the end of his playing career in New Zealand he was in competition with Mark Ranby and Keith Lowen for starting positions in both sides. He won the Ranfurly Shield twice with Waikato, against Taranaki in 1996 and Auckland in 1997.

At the end of the 2001 season, McLeod departed New Zealand to take up a professional contract in Japan with Toshiba Brave Lupus. He played for Toshiba from 2002 until his retirement in 2009.

All Blacks career
McLeod played his first tests for the All Blacks in 1996, starting at second five-eighth in place of the injured Walter Little against Manu Samoa and Scotland. McLeod lost his test place to Little but went on to play as a midweek and substitute player in 17 All Black matches between 1996 and 1998, including 10 tests and three test starts. McLeod lost his place in the test squad due to injuries, loss of form and increasing competition from players like Mark Mayerhofler, Alama Ieremia and Eroni Clarke. He remained on the periphery of All Blacks selections up until 2000, with six appearances for New Zealand A.

Coaching career
McLeod returned to New Zealand from Japan in 2008 to work as skills coach for the Waikato rugby team. He returned to Hamilton permanently in 2009 after finishing his final season with Toshiba. In 2009, McLeod was appointed assistant coach to Chris Gibbes for the Waikato Air New Zealand Cup (now ITM Cup) team. McLeod has worked as skills coach for the Waikato Chiefs. He is currently the assistant coach of the All Blacks.

Personal life
McLeod is married to Dana and the couple have four children. In 2008, the destruction of his house by an arsonist received national coverage in New Zealand.

References

External links
 
 Waikato Rugby Union profile

1973 births
Living people
New Zealand rugby union coaches
New Zealand rugby union players
Rugby union centres
New Zealand international rugby union players
Chiefs (rugby union) players
Toshiba Brave Lupus Tokyo players
People educated at Hamilton Boys' High School